Eutaxia parvifolia is a species of flowering plant in the family Fabaceae and is endemic to southwestern Western Australia. It is a shrub with reddish brown stems, elliptic to egg-shaped leaves with the narrower end towards the base, and mostly yellow, red or orange flowers, with yellow red or orange markings.

Description
The petals are mostly yellow, red or orange with yellow, red or orange spots, streaks or blotches.

Taxonomy
Eutaxia parvifolia was formally described in 1837 by English botanist George Bentham in Enumeratio plantarum quas in Novae Hollandiae ora austro-occidentali ad fluvium Cygnorum et in sinu Regis Georgii collegit Carolus Liber Baro de Hügel, based on plant material collected by Charles von Hügel in King George Sound. The specific epithet (parvifolia) means "small-leaved".

Distribution and habitat
This eutaxia grows in heath and woodland between Bolgart, Albany and the Cape Arid National Park.

Conservation status
Eutaxia parvifolia is classified as "not threatened" by the Government of Western Australia Department of Parks and Wildlife.

References

parvifolia
Fabales of Australia
Rosids of Western Australia
Plants described in 1837